Crenicichla albopunctata is a species of cichlid native to South America. It is found in the Approuague River in French Guiana to the Demerara River in Guyana.

References

albopunctata
Fish of French Guiana
Fish of Guyana
Taxa named by Jacques Pellegrin
Fish described in 1904